"Desi Kalakaar" is the title track song from the album Desi Kalaakar by Honey Singh produced by Gulshan Kumar, story and screen play is by Yo Yo Honey Singh. The song features Sonakshi Sinha, Yo Yo Honey Singh, Gulshan Grover in the music video. The video was filmed in various locations around suburbs of Los Angeles, California including Culver City and Palmdale.

Reception 
The music video received the amazing public review. The video has received over 100 million views on T-Series official channel of YouTube.

The second track, "LOVE DOSE", video was released on 3 October 2014 on 'T-Series' official YouTube channel. The video for "Love Dose", featuring Yo Yo Honey Singh and Urvashi Rautela, received 10 million views on YouTube within a single week. The video song has received over 290 million views . The song's last portion of the dance was shot at Westfield Stratford City in London, UK.
In total the albums has received over 500 million views on YouTube.

Other 
Sonakshi Sinha has recently recreated the hugely popular 'Love Dose' track from an entirely female perspective, and plans to present her rendition at the Dabangg Reloaded tour in Atlanta which commenced on June 22.

Music Video 
The video was filmed in various locations around suburbs of Los Angeles, California including Culver City and Palmdale. Singh calls his girlfriend Sonakshi and asks for ride, she accepts despite her father's refusal, during segment he goes to tuck shop where shop keeper got news about him and police started chasing until at last segment He got caught.

Track listing

References

2014 songs
Hindi-language songs
Yo Yo Honey Singh songs
T-Series (company) singles